The 1900–01 team went 0–3 for the first losing season in school history and the only winless team in school history. It was the only year for coach M. Everett Dick. The team captain was F.L. Cross.

Roster

Schedule
EMU & MSU Media Guides both have the date of March 16 however Detroit Free Press has March 9. The game against the Detroit YMCA isn't listed in the EMU Media Guide but is published in the EMU Yearbook for 1901.

|-
!colspan=9 style="background:#006633; color:#FFFFFF;"| Non-conference regular season

References

Eastern Michigan Eagles men's basketball seasons
Michigan State Normal